Lieutenant-Colonel Augustus Henry Archibald Anson, VC (5 March 1835 – 17 November 1877) was a member of the Anson family and a recipient of the Victoria Cross, the highest and most prestigious award for gallantry in the face of the enemy that can be awarded to British and Commonwealth forces. He served as Member of Parliament for Lichfield from 1859 until 1868, and for Bewdley from 1869 to 1874.

Life and career
Anson was a son of Thomas Anson, 1st Earl of Lichfield, and it was when he was 22 years old and a captain in the 84th Regiment of Foot (later the 2nd Bn, York and Lancaster Regiment), during the Indian Mutiny, when the following deeds took place on 28 September 1857 at Bolandshahr and at Lucknow, on 16 November 1857, for which he was awarded the VC. Despatch from Major-General Sir James Hope Grant, K.C.B., dated 12 August 1858:

On his return to England, he married Amelia Claughton, a daughter of the future first Bishop of St Albans, Rev. Thomas Legh Claughton. Anson later achieved the rank of lieutenant colonel. In 1859, he was elected Member of Parliament for Lichfield as a Liberal, holding the seat until 1868. Although losing the by-election in 1869 for Bewdley the election was overturned on petition and the seat was awarded to him.  He won the subsequent election and remained in parliament until 1874.

In 1870, he was one of two directors of The Land and Sea Telegraph Construction Company Ltd. as it applied to be wound up, the other being William Palliser. Anson was then "of Dudley House, Park-lane, in the county of Middlesex".

Anson died at the age of 42 in Cannes, France, and was buried there.  There is a memorial plaque to him in Lichfield Cathedral.

Works
 The supersession of the colonels of the Royal Army (1873)

References

External links
 
 
Burial location of Augustus Anson "France"
Location of Augustus Anson's Victoria Cross "The Shugborough Estate"

1835 births
1877 deaths
British recipients of the Victoria Cross
Indian Rebellion of 1857 recipients of the Victoria Cross
84th Regiment of Foot officers
Members of the Parliament of the United Kingdom for English constituencies
Younger sons of earls
UK MPs 1859–1865
UK MPs 1865–1868
UK MPs 1868–1874
People from Haverfordwest
British Army personnel of the Crimean War
British Army personnel of the Second Opium War
7th Queen's Own Hussars officers
Augustus
British Army recipients of the Victoria Cross